Club de femmes (a.k.a. Girls' Club or Women's Club) is a 1936 French film directed and written by Jacques Deval, and starring Danielle Darrieux.

Cast
Danielle Darrieux as Claire Derouve 
Josette Day as Juliette  
Betty Stockfeld as Greta Kremmer  
Else Argal as Alice Hermin
Georgette  as Carol Royce  
Ève Francis as Mme. Fargeton, Hotel Director 
Junie Astor as Helene  
Valentine Tessier as Dr. Gabrielle Aubry

References

External links

Club de femmes at filmsdefrance.com

1936 films
French black-and-white films
Lesbian-related films
French LGBT-related films
Films featuring an all-female cast
Films based on works by Jacques Deval
French crime drama films
1936 crime drama films
1930s English-language films
1930s French films